Rodnikovsky is a rural locality (a khutor) in Staroanninskoye Rural Settlement, Novoanninsky District, Volgograd Oblast, Russia. The population was 139 as of 2010. There are 3 streets.

Geography 
Rodnikovsky is located 11 km southwest of Novoanninsky (the district's administrative centre) by road. Vesyoly is the nearest rural locality.

References 

Rural localities in Novoanninsky District